Guillaume Lambert (born January 31, 1984) is a Canadian actor and filmmaker from Sorel-Tracy, Quebec, most noted as a writer, producer and star of the web television series Adulthood (L'Âge adulte) and director of the film Niagara.

He has also appeared in the films Gerontophilia and Life's a Bitch (Toutes des connes), and the television series Nouvelle adresse, Ruptures, Like-moi!,
Échappées and La Confrérie.

In 2015 he published the novel Satyriasis : mes années romantiques, an autofiction about navigating contemporary dating culture as a gay man. He published his second novel, Eschatologie, in 2022.

His first feature film as a director, My Intelligent Comedy (Les scènes fortuites), was released in 2018. In 2021 he co-created and co-wrote the limited dramatic series Audrey est revenue for Club Illico. Niagara, his second feature film, was released in 2022.

He won two Gémeaux Awards in 2022, for Best Supporting Actor in a Comedy for La Confrérie and Best Writing for Audrey est revenue.

References

External links

1984 births
Living people
21st-century Canadian male actors
21st-century Canadian screenwriters
21st-century Canadian male writers
21st-century Canadian novelists
21st-century Canadian comedians
Canadian male film actors
Canadian male television actors
Canadian male web series actors
Canadian male screenwriters
Canadian male novelists
Canadian male comedians
Canadian sketch comedians
Canadian television writers
Canadian novelists in French
Canadian screenwriters in French
Canadian gay actors
Canadian gay writers
Gay screenwriters
LGBT film directors
French Quebecers
Male actors from Quebec
People from Sorel-Tracy
Writers from Quebec
21st-century Canadian LGBT people